The Burlington Rangers was the final moniker of the minor league baseball teams based in Burlington, North Carolina between 1942 and 1972. Burington teams played as members of the Bi-State League (1942) and Carolina League (1945-1955; 1958-1972).

Burlington was an affiliate of the Cleveland Indians from 1958 to 1963.

Today, the Burlington Franchise is in the Appalachian League as the Burlington Royals, having begun play in that league in 1986.

Notable alumni
 Tommie Agee (1962) 2 x MLB All-Star; 1966 AL Rookie of the Year
 Gene Conley (1964) 4 x MLB All Star
 Dick Hall (1952)
 Toby Harrah (1968-1969) 4 x MLB All-Star
 Ron Kline (1952)
 Jack McKeon (1952) Manager: 2003 World Series Champion - Florida Marlins
 Sonny Siebert (1960) 2 x MLB All-Star
 Luis Tiant (1963) 3 x MLB All-Star; 2 x AL ERA Title (1968, 1972)
 John Wockenfuss (1969)

Baseball teams established in 1942
Baseball teams disestablished in 1972
1942 establishments in North Carolina
1972 disestablishments in North Carolina
Burlington, North Carolina
Professional baseball teams in North Carolina
Cleveland Guardians minor league affiliates
Defunct Carolina League teams
Defunct baseball teams in North Carolina